Berovo is a municipality in eastern part of Republic of North Macedonia. Berovo is also the name of the town where the municipal seat is found. Berovo Municipality is part of the Eastern Statistical Region.

Geography
The municipality borders
 Pehčevo Municipality, Delčevo Municipality, and Vinica Municipality to the north,
 Radoviš Municipality and Vasilevo Municipality to the west,
 Bosilovo Municipality and Novo Selo Municipality to the south, and
 Bulgaria to the east.

Demographics
According to the last National census from 2021 this municipality has 10,890 inhabitants.

Ethnic groups in the municipality include:

References

External links
 Official website

 
Municipalities of North Macedonia
Eastern Statistical Region